Sounds Good is a Canadian music television miniseries which aired on CBC Television in 1976.

Premise
This four-part series featured particular genres of modern music and various performers. Jim McKenna hosted Sounds Good except the country music episode.

 Folk: featured Ellen McIlwaine, Don McLean, Myles and Lenny and David Wiffen
 Country (10 September 1976): featured Carroll Baker, Tim Daniels (later of Comin' Up Country), Mary Lou Del Gatto, Prairie Oyster
 Disco: featured Crack of Dawn, Soul Express, Sweet Blindness and Rick Wamil
 Jazz: featured Moe Koffman Sextet, Peter Appleyard, Aura and Clark Terry

Sounds Good was hastily produced on a low (approximately ) budget when CBC's Studio 7 became unexpectedly available for three days. A previously-planned television feature on Nellie McClung was scheduled to film there but production was cancelled when ACTRA objected to the choice of an American actor portraying McClung.

Scheduling
The hour-long episodes were broadcast on 4 August 10 September, 18 and 28 September 1976.

References

External links
 

CBC Television original programming
1976 Canadian television series debuts
1976 Canadian television series endings